The anthem of Zulia State, “Riding the Waves”, became official by Executive Order of August 15, 1909. It was the result of a public competition sponsored by the then Governor of the State, Jose Ignacio Lares Baralt, who on April 29 of that year, held a lyric and musical contest to select the words and melody of such treasured lyrical piece. The winner of the lyrical category was the famed poet laureate, Udón Perez; in the musical category, the winner was the equally renowned author, Jose Antonio Cháves. The winning entries were officially recognized on the above date, during a ceremony headed by the illustrious governor, but it was not until February 18, 1910 that the anthem was finally distributed throughout the various departments and offices of the State. With its beautiful melody, and a theme built around the ideas of freedom, peace, and hope, the anthem has remained a favorite of the people. It still speaks a revolutionary language - highly critical of dictatorship - and continues to communicate the State’s age-old abhorrence of centralist powers.

Lyrics in Spanish

Chorus 
Sobre palmas y lauros de oro 
yergue el Zulia su limpio blasón; 
y flamea en su plaustro sonoros 
del progreso el radiante pendón.

I 
La luz con el relámpago tenaz del Catatumbo, 
del nauta fija el rumbo, 
cual límpido farol; 
el alba de los trópicos, 
la hoguera que deslumbra 
cuando al zénit se encumbra 
la cuadriga del sol 
no emulan de tus glorias  
el fúlgido arrebol 

II 
En la defensa olímpica 
de los nativos fueros 
tus hijos, sus aceros 
llevaron al confín; 
ciñendo lauros múltiples 
los viste, con arrobo, 
del Lago a Carabobo, 
del Ávila a Junín; 
y en Tarqui y Ayacucho 
vibraron su clarín. 

III 
Erguido como Júpiter, 
la diestra en alto armada, 
fulgurante la mirada 
de rabia y de rencor; 
las veces que los sátrapas 
quisieron tu mancilla: 
mirarte de rodilla 
sin prez y sin honor  
cayó sobre sus frentes 
tu rayo vengador. 

IV 
Y luego que la cólera 
de tu justicia calmas, 
va en pos de nuevas palmas 
tu espíritu vivaz; 
en aulas de areópagos, 
cabildos y liceos; 
te brindan sus trofeos 
el numen de la paz; 
y vese en blanca aureola  
resplandecer tu faz. 

V 
En tu carroza alígera 
que tiran diez corceles, 
de cantos y laureles 
guirnaldas mil se ven. 
Allí del arte el símbolo 
del sabio la corona, 
de Temis y Pomona 
la espada y el lairén. 
La enseña del trabajo 
y el lábaro del bien. 

VI 
Jamás, jamás, los déspotas 
o la invasión taimada, 
la oliva por la espada 
te obliguen a trocar; 
y sigas a la cúspide; 
triunfante como eres, 
rumores de talleres 
oyendo sin cesar 
en vez de los clarines 
y el parche militar.

See also
 List of anthems of Venezuela

Anthems of Venezuela
Spanish-language songs
Zulia
1909 songs